Meenakshi Reddy Madhavan is an Indian blogger and writer who writes under the pseudonym eM on The Compulsive Confessor. Her first book, a semi-autobiographical book is You Are Here, was published by Penguin.

She is the daughter of the Malayalam writer and former Indian Administrative Service officer N. S. Madhavan. Her mother Sheela Reddy is a journalist, a former editor of Indian magazine Outlook and author of Mr. and Mrs. Jinnah: The Marriage.

Bibliography
 The One Who Swam with the Fishes (2017)
 Before, And Then After (2015)
 Split (2015)
 Cold Feet (2012)
 The Life & Times of Layla The Ordinary (2010)
 You are Here (2008)

References

External links

The Compulsive Confessor
Meenakshi Reddy Madhavan at Penguin India

Indian bloggers
Living people
Indian women bloggers
Women writers from Kerala
Year of birth missing (living people)
21st-century pseudonymous writers
Pseudonymous women writers